Nitidula carnaria  is a species of sap beetle in the Nitidulidae family.

References

Nitidulidae
Beetles described in 1783